Sahuayo (Nahuatl: Tzacuātlayotl) is a city in the state of Michoacán, in western México, near the southern shore of Lake Chapala. It serves as the municipal seat for the surrounding municipality of the same name. Sahuayo is an important center for industry and is the center of commerce for the Chapala lake region, specialising in crafts, sandals (huaraches), hats (sombreros) which are made by Sahuayenses. It is home to the largest huarache in the world measuring 7.45 meters long and 3.09 meters wide. The name means "turtle shaped pot", it has been called the Athens of Michoacán because of the number of important poets, writers and painters residing there. It is currently the seat for the Arts Propositions Association. In 2005, the census population was 59,316, with the municipality being 61,965. The size of the municipality is 128.05 km² (49.44 sq mi).

The celebration for El Patrón Santiago or Saint James the Great is held every 25th of July , during these celebrations, individuals craft beautiful masks, throw a festival with music and dancing, and depict the battles between the Spanish and the indigenous peoples. The dancers Tlahualiles (wearers of the masks and traditional garments) are internationally recognized. The sister city of Sahuayo is Lancaster, California, United States. It is one of the 3 Californian cities where residents from Sahuayo moved to in the 2000s. The city of Santa Ana, California is known as Little Sahuayo because of the high number of residents who hail from Sahuayo. Another community is Indio, California where a large numbers of residents from Sahuayo moved to.

Location

Sahuayo is located to the northwest of the State, at the coordinates 20º03' north latitude and 102º44' west longitude, 1,530 meters above sea level. To the north of the Sahuayo border one finds Venustiano Carranza (also known as San Pedro), to the east Villamar, to the south  Jiquilpan, and Cojumatlán de Régules to the northwest. Its distance to the State Capital, Morelia, is 215 km. The name Sahuayo comes from the Nahuatl language, and is interpreted in many ways. According to the philologist and lawyer Cecilio A. Róbelo, it means "in where gives the scabies"; according to the Dr. "Don" Antonio Peñafiel, the word is made up of two elements: tzacuātl and ayotl, where tzacuātl (pot) is a vase formed by one half of a coconut and "ayotl," which translates into "turtle"; hence vessel turtle or vessel that has the aspect of a turtle.

Seal

 
There is a turtle on the stone in the first field, which represents the foundation of Sahuayo in 1530. In background are three hills, which symbolise the three towns that gave origin to Sahuayo, in the second half of the 16th century. The hills can also be considered to represent the three governments: federal, state and municipal. In the third field, a plumed serpent or Quetzalcoatl god fights with the cross, symbolising the conquest of Sahuayo by Nuño Beltrán de Guzmán. In the fourth field of the municipal shield is a tree and a star. “Patria, Justicia y Progreso” (Nation, Justice and Progress) are written in the contour of the shield.

Cuisine
Sahuayo is famous for its typical food such as carnitas, dry birria, and tacos al pastor. their traditional breads like tranca and the cemita usually are usually accompanied by milk, atole, or any other hot drink.

Notable residents
Hector Fajardo – Ex-Major League Baseball player
Lilia Prado – actress
Saint José "Joselito" Sánchez del Río – martyr of the Cristero War, canonized by Pope Francis in October, 16, 2016

References

Link to tables of population data from Census of 2005 INEGI: Instituto Nacional de Estadística, Geografía e Informática
Michoacán Enciclopedia de los Municipios de México

External links

Government pages
Negotiating Extra-Territorial Citizenship: Mexican Migrants and the Transborder Politics of Community
 Government Page

City information
 Semanario Tribuna Sahuayo's Newspaper

Municipalities of Michoacán